Ghazi-Walid Falah is a Bedouin Israeli-Canadian geographer, who is a tenured professor at the University of Akron, Ohio. He is an expert on political, social and urban geography of the Middle East and the Arab World, with special emphasis on Israel. He has published over 45 articles in 23 peer reviewed journals, and he has given papers at numerous conferences. He is author and co-editor of five books and monographs, including Geographies of Muslim Women (Guilford Publications, 2005), co-edited with Caroline Nagel. He also has co-authored articles with two colleagues, David Newman and Colin Flint, with whom he has conducted joint research.

Falah is a founder of the Toronto-based peer review international journal The Arab World Geographer and serves as its Editor-in-Chief. The AWG has become the major journal published in English for research on the geography of the Arab, Muslim, and Middle-Eastern worlds.

Biography

Early years
Ghazi-Walid Falah was born in the village of Falahat Al Batouf, Galilee, Palestinian. He earned his B.A and M.A from the Hebrew University of Jerusalem and PhD in Geography from Durham University. After completing his doctorate in 1982, Dr. Falah taught geography for a short period at Tel Aviv University, An-Najah University and in Hebron.

In 1987, he established the Galilee Center for Social Research in Nazareth, a research institute focused on Arab communities living in Israel, and he served as its first Executive Director until relocating to North America in 1991. There he was appointed as Fulbright Scholar and Visiting Associate Professor of Geography at the University of Northern Iowa.

Canada
In 1993, Falah migrated to Canada and subsequently became a Canadian citizen. He started a new chapter in his academic career in Toronto, with a grant from the MacArthur Foundation, and was based at the University of Toronto as Visiting Associate Professor in the Department of Geography and Planning. During that same period, he was also a visiting scholar for five months at the University of Paris, Sorbonne, supported by a French CNRS research grant. His research has included studies of the differential distribution of facilities in Israeli Jewish and Arab areas.

He joined the University of Toronto Centre for Urban and Community Studies in 1995 as Research Associate, remaining there until 2001. While working on his research in Toronto, Falah also served, 1995-1997, as Lecturer at the University of Wales, Lampeter, a center for studies on the Muslim world. He then returned to the U.S., and accepted a position in the Department of Geography and Planning at the University of Akron in Ohio.

Detention and release
He was held for over three weeks in an Israeli jail after he was arrested on suspicion of espionage on July 8, 2006, while touring near the Lebanon border. The arrest occurred one week before the 2006 Israeli-Lebanon conflict. He was denied access to a lawyer for the first 18 days of his detention.

On July 30, 2006, the Israeli Shin Bet security service and the Israeli police released Dr. Falah without filing charges against him.

Recent activities
In recent years, Ghazi Falah has broadened his interests to include the geography of the media, focusing on the representation of Arabs and Muslims in daily newspapers in the U.S. His professional visits to Arab and Muslim countries include Egypt, Jordan, Morocco, Tunisia, Lebanon, Syria, UAE, Kuwait, Bahrain, Oman, and Iran.

At present, Ghazi Falah is a tenured Full Professor at the University of Akron and engaged in research on American bilateral relations with the Arab world. This new project is based on an extensive student opinion survey conducted at university campuses in Lebanon and Kuwait.

References

Living people
Arab citizens of Israel
Bedouin Israelis
Canadian expatriate academics in the United States
Canadian geographers
Canadian Muslims
Canadian expatriates in England
Israeli expatriates in England
Israeli geographers
Israeli emigrants to Canada
Naturalized citizens of Canada
University of Akron faculty
Academic staff of the University of Toronto
Year of birth missing (living people)
Academic staff of An-Najah National University
Alumni of the College of St Hild and St Bede, Durham
Hebrew University of Jerusalem alumni
Academic staff of Tel Aviv University
Academics of the University of Wales, Lampeter
Israeli expatriates in the United States